Conus therriaulti is a species of sea snail, a marine gastropod mollusk in the family Conidae, the cone snails, cone shells or cones.

These snails are predatory and venomous. They are capable of "stinging" humans.

Description
The size of the shell attains 43 mm.

Distribution
This marine species of cone snail occurs in the Caribbean Sea off Yucatán, Mexico

References

 Edward J. Petuch (2013), Biogeography and Biodiversity of Western Atlantic Mollusks; CRC Press

External links
 To World Register of Marine Species
 

therriaulti
Gastropods described in 2013